Nikashi is a census village in Baksa district, Assam, India.  As per the 2011 Census of India, Nikashi village has a total population of 2,510 people including 1,261 males and 1,249 females with a literacy rate of 62.83%.

References 

Villages in Baksa district